Dichagyris orientis is a moth of the family Noctuidae. It is found from Croatia, south to Macedonia, east to Romania, Ukraine and Russia and further east to central Asia, Turkestan, south-western Siberia, the Caucasus, Armenia, Turkey, Iran, western China and Mongolia (the Altai Mountains).

Subspecies
Dichagyris orientis orientis
Dichagyris orientis pseudosignifera (Boursin, 1952)  (Croatia, Macedonia, Romania, Ukraine, southern Russia)
Dichagyris orientis pygmaea (Hampson, 1903)  (eastern Russia)
?Dichagyris orientis improcera

References

External links
Fauna Europaea

orientis
Moths of Europe
Moths of Asia
Moths described in 1882